Meghan Picerno is an American theatre actress and singer. She is best known for her five-year history of playing the role of Christine Daaé in several productions, including the US Premiere and 1st National Tour of Love Never Dies, and the world tour and Broadway production of The Phantom of the Opera.

Education 
Meghan Picerno studied music at Illinois Wesleyan University. She later graduated from Manhattan School of Music with a M.M. in voice.

Career
Picerno began her career in the opera world. In 2015, she was a quarterfinalist in Plácido Domingo's Operalia International Vocal Competition. She has also performed La fée from Massenet's Cendrillon in Montreal, and the Queen of the Night in Mozart's Die Zauberflöte at Lincoln Center and Carnegie Hall.

Picerno's first crossover into musical theatre was New York City Opera's Candide, which was directed by Hal Prince. She played Cunégonde at this production. 

Hal Prince and his team then cast Picerno as Christine Daaé in the US Premiere and First National Tour of Andrew Lloyd Webber's Love Never Dies, the sequel to the hit and longest-running stage musical The Phantom of the Opera. In 2019, she reprised the role in the second world tour of The Phantom of the Opera. Later in the year, she transferred to the New York production to make her Broadway debut in the role. After reopening The Phantom of the Opera on Broadway after the COVID-19 pandemic shutdown, Picerno played her final show as Christine Daaé on January 23, 2022, ending her five-year run as the character.

Performance credits

References 

Living people
Year of birth missing (living people)
21st-century American women  opera singers
American musical theatre actresses
21st-century American actresses
Illinois Wesleyan University alumni
Manhattan School of Music alumni